The men's 96 kg competition at the 2019 World Weightlifting Championships was held on 23 and 24 September 2019.

Schedule

Medalists

Records

Results

References

Results 

Men's 96 kg